The 2003 Bayelsa State gubernatorial election occurred on April 19, 2003. Incumbent Governor, PDP's Diepreye Alamieyeseigha won election for a second term, defeating ANPP's Millionaire Abowei and two other candidates.

Diepreye Alamieyeseigha won the PDP nomination at the primary election. He retained Goodluck Jonathan as his running mate.

Electoral system
The Governor of Bayelsa State is elected using the plurality voting system.

Results
A total of four candidates registered with the Independent National Electoral Commission to contest in the election. Incumbent Governor, DSP Alamieyesiegha won election for a second term, defeating four other candidates.

The total number of registered voters in the state was 765,472. About 97.38% (i.e. 745,408) of registered voters participated in the exercise.

References 

Bayelsa State gubernatorial elections
Bayelsa State
Bayelsa State gubernatorial election
gubernatorial